Laurie Kreiner (born 30 June 1954) is a Canadian former alpine skier who competed in the 1972 Winter Olympics and in the 1976 Winter Olympics.

References

External links

1954 births
Living people
Canadian female alpine skiers
Olympic alpine skiers of Canada
Alpine skiers at the 1972 Winter Olympics
Alpine skiers at the 1976 Winter Olympics